The 2021–22 Missouri State Bears basketball team represented Missouri State University during the 2021–22 NCAA Division I men's basketball season. The Bears, led by fourth-year head coach Dana Ford, played their home games at JQH Arena in Springfield, Missouri as members of the Missouri Valley Conference. They finished the season 23–11, 13–5 in MVC Play to finish a three-way tie for 2nd place. They defeated Valparaiso in the quarterfinals of the MVC tournament before losing in the semifinals to Drake. They received an at-large bid to the National Invitation Tournament where they lost in the first round to Oklahoma.

Previous season 
In a season limited due to the ongoing COVID-19 pandemic, the Bears finished the 2020–21 season 17–7, 12–6 in MVC play to finish in third place. They defeated Valparaiso in the quarterfinals of the MVC tournament before losing to Drake in the semifinals.

Roster

Schedule and results

|-
!colspan=9 style=| Regular season

|-
!colspan=12 style=| MVC tournament

|-
!colspan=12 style=| NIT tournament

Source

References

Missouri State Bears basketball seasons
Missouri State
Missouri State, basketball men
Missouri State, basketball men
Missouri State